Patrick Liewig (born 4 October 1950 in France) is a French football manager.

References

1950 births
Living people
French football managers
Stade Tunisien managers
MC Alger managers
EGS Gafsa managers
Simba S.C. managers
Grombalia Sports managers
French expatriate football managers
Expatriate football managers in Ivory Coast
French expatriate sportspeople in Ivory Coast
Expatriate football managers in Tunisia
French expatriate sportspeople in Tunisia
Expatriate football managers in Algeria
French expatriate sportspeople in Algeria
Expatriate football managers in Tanzania
French expatriate sportspeople in Tanzania
Expatriate football managers in Ghana
West African Football Academy managers
Ghana Premier League managers